Eremophila grandiflora is a flowering plant in the figwort family, Scrophulariaceae and is endemic to Western Australia. It is a large shrub with shiny leaves and the largest flowers in its genus and is only known from a restricted area near Paynes Find.

Description
The branches are also covered with small raised glands and the younger branches are hairy.

The tube is brown with darker markings with spreading petal lobes that are pale lilac-blue to almost white, with purple or brown spots near their bases and inside the tube. The outside of the tube and petal lobes is hairy while the inside is mostly glabrous. The 4 stamens extend beyond the end of the tube. Flowering occurs from June to early September.

Taxonomy and naming
The species was first formally described by Andrew Brown and Bevan Buirchell in 2007 and the description was published in Nuytsia. The specific epithet (grandiflora) is from Latin words meaning "great" or "large" and "-flowered".

Distribution and habitat
Eremophila grandiflora is common in a small area near Paynes Find in the Yalgoo biogeographic region where it grows in stony clay soils along drainage lines and slopes.

Conservation status
This species is classified as "Priority Three" by the Government of Western Australia Department of Parks and Wildlife, meaning that it is poorly known and known from only a few locations but is not under imminent threat.

References

grandiflora
Eudicots of Western Australia
Plants described in 2007
Endemic flora of Western Australia
Taxa named by Bevan Buirchell
Taxa named by Andrew Phillip Brown